Vesa Ranta (born 20 July 1973) is a Finnish drummer. He was one of the original members of the metal bands Sentenced and The Man-Eating Tree. He is also a fine art photographer and was owner of the Nuclear Nightclub live music club and bar in downtown Oulu.

Discography

Studio albums 
 Shadows of the Past (1991)
 North from Here (1993)
 Amok (1995)
 Down (1996)
 Frozen (1998)
 Crimson (2000)
 The Cold White Light (2002)
 The Funeral Album (2005)
  Vine (2010)
 Harvest (2011)
 In the Absence of Light (2015)

EPs 
 The Trooper (1993)
 Love & Death (1995)

Live album 
 Buried Alive (2 discs, 2006)

DVDs 
 Buried Alive (2 discs, 2006)

Singles 
 Killing Me Killing You (1999)
 No One There (2002)
 Ever-Frost (2005)
 Despair Ridden Hearts (2005)

 Compilation 
 Story: A Recollection (1997)

 Demos 
 When Death Joins Us... (1990)
 Rotting Ways to Misery (1991)
 Journey to Pohjola (1992)
 Demo 1994 (1994)

 Split albums 
 Cronology of Death'' (1991)
 promo split MCD (2005)

References 

Finnish drummers
1973 births
Living people
People from Muhos
Fine art photographers
21st-century drummers